Andrew William Roscoe is a Scottish computer scientist. He was Head of the Department of Computer Science, University of Oxford from 2003 to 2014, and is a Professor of Computer Science. He is also a Fellow of University College, Oxford.

Education and career 
Roscoe was born in Dundee, Scotland. He studied for a degree in mathematics at University College, Oxford, from 1975 to 1978, graduating with the top mark for his year in the university. He went on to work at the Computing Laboratory and received his DPhil in 1982. He was appointed Tutorial Fellow at University College in 1983 and served as Senior Tutor from 1993 to 1997. He was head of the Department of Computer Science 2003-08 and 2009–14.

Research 
Professor Roscoe works in the area of concurrency theory, in particular the semantic underpinning of Communicating Sequential Processes (CSP) and the associated occam programming language with Sir Tony Hoare. He co-founded Formal Systems (Europe) Limited and worked on the algorithms for the Failures-Divergence Refinement (FDR) tool.

References

External links
 Bill Roscoe home page
 
 

Living people
People from Dundee
People educated at the High School of Dundee
Alumni of University College, Oxford
Scottish computer scientists
Members of the Department of Computer Science, University of Oxford
Formal methods people
Fellows of University College, Oxford
Scottish scholars and academics
1956 births